The National Musical String Company is a defunct music string factory located in New Brunswick, New Jersey.  The company was to make the first harmonicas in America, and became the world's largest producer of steel strings.
The property is being redeveloped by Pioli Properties as a mixed-use site with the primary National Music String building renovated for commercial retail uses on the first level, and 38 residential apartment units on the second and third floors.

See also
List of the oldest buildings in New Jersey
National Register of Historic Places listings in Middlesex County, New Jersey

References

Musical instrument manufacturing companies of the United States
Manufacturing companies based in New Jersey
Companies based in New Brunswick, New Jersey